Rasbora arundinata is a species of ray-finned fish in the genus Rasbora. It inhabits the Tripa Jaya, Kluet, and Alas rivers in Sumatra.

References 

Rasboras
Freshwater fish of Sumatra
Taxa named by Daniel Lumbantobing
Fish described in 2014